The American Association Manager of the Year Award was an annual award given to the best manager in Minor League Baseball's American Association based on their regular-season performance. Though the league was established in 1902, the award was not created until 1953. It continued to be issued through the 1962 season, after which the league disbanded. In 1969, both the league and the award were revived, and the honor continued to be given until the league disbanded for a second time after the 1997 season.

Nine managers won the award on multiple occasions. Joe Sparks won the award five times, more than any other manager. Marc Bombard and Vern Rapp each won three times. Kerby Farrell, Jim Fregosi, Jim Marshall, Gene Mauch, Jack McKeon, and Rick Renick each won the award twice. Sparks (1986, 1987, and 1988) won three of his five awards consecutively, while Mauch (1958 and 1959), McKeon (1969 and 1970), and Bombard (1994 and 1995) won in back-to-back seasons.

Fourteen managers from the Indianapolis Indians won the Manager of the Year Award, more than any other team in the league, followed by the Denver Zephyrs and Omaha Royals (4); the Evansville Triplets and Minneapolis Millers (3); the Iowa Cubs, Louisville Redbirds, Nashville Sounds, and Wichita Aeros (2); and the Buffalo Bisons, Louisville Colonels, Oklahoma City 89ers, Omaha Dodgers, and Toledo Sox (1).

Eight managers from the Montreal Expos Major League Baseball (MLB) organization won the award, more than any other, followed by the Cincinnati Reds organization (6); the Chicago White Sox and Kansas City Royals organizations (4); the Detroit Tigers and Milwaukee Braves organizations (3); the Boston Red Sox, Chicago Cubs, Cleveland Indians, and St. Louis Cardinals organizations (2); and the Los Angeles Dodgers, Milwaukee Brewers, New York Giants, Pittsburgh Pirates, and Texas Rangers

Winners

Wins by team

Wins by organization

Notes

References
Specific

General

1953 establishments in the United States
1998 disestablishments in the United States
Manager
Awards established in 1953
Awards disestablished in 1998
Minor league baseball coaching awards